Rita Van De Velde (born 23 September 1941) is a Belgian gymnast. She competed in five events at the 1960 Summer Olympics.

References

1941 births
Living people
Belgian female artistic gymnasts
Olympic gymnasts of Belgium
Gymnasts at the 1960 Summer Olympics
Sportspeople from East Flanders